Odgerel (Starlight) is a 1957 novel by Mongolian author Sonomyn Udval. The novel relates the story of the hardship of a Gobi woman during her course of life.

References

1957 novels
Novels by Sonomyn Udval